Shiloh, Shilo, or Silo (/ˈʃaɪloʊ/; Hebrew: שִׁלוֹ ,שִׁילֹה ,שִׁלֹה, and שִׁילוֹ variably) is mainly known as the name of the biblical city which preceded Jerusalem as the central worship site of the early Israelites. One bible verse, Genesis 49:10, might indicate that it was also used as the personal name of a biblical figure.

Bible
 Shiloh (biblical city), an ancient city in Samaria, located just west of the modern town of Shiloh.
 Shiloh (biblical figure), a figure of contested meaning mentioned in the Hebrew Bible.

Books and entertainment

 Shiloh (franchise), a series of novels and film adaptations
 Shiloh (Naylor novel), a 1991 children's novel by Phyllis Reynolds Naylor
 Shiloh (film), a 1996 family movie produced and directed by Dale Rosenbloom
 Shiloh (Foote novel), a 1952 historical novel by Shelby Foote about the American Civil War battle
 "Shiloh," a short story by Bobbie Ann Mason, published in the 1982 collection of Mason short stories Shiloh and Other Stories
 Battleground 4: Shiloh, a 1996 computer game
 Shiloh, a chapter of The Civil War (miniseries) by Ken Burns, cited as a Hebrew word meaning "place of peace"
 Craig Shilo, a character in the television series Blue Mountain State
 Shiloh, the capital city in Kings (American TV series)
 Shiloh Ranch, the setting for the television series The Virginian / The Men From Shiloh

Military
 Battle of Shiloh, a major battle of the American Civil War, in Tennessee
 Shiloh National Military Park, preserving the Shiloh and Corinth battlefields
 USS Shiloh (1865), a single-turreted, twin-screw monitor
 USS Shiloh (CG-67), a Ticonderoga-class guided missile cruiser of the United States Navy

Music
 Shilo (album), a compilation album of songs recorded by Neil Diamond
 "Shilo" (song), written and recorded by Neil Diamond
 Shiloh, an early band formed by Don Henley of the Eagles
 "Shiloh", a Christmas carol written by William Billings in 1781
 Shiloh (singer), former stage name of Canadian pop singer and songwriter Shiloh Hoganson (born 1993)
 An alias of Willem Rebergen (born 1985), Dutch DJ and music producer, stage name Headhunterz
 “Shiloh,” a song written and recorded by Audrey Assad
 “Shiloh,” a song written and recorded by Buju Banton, from the album 'Til Shiloh
 Shiloh Dynasty, a singer and songwriter

People
 Shiloh (given name), a unisex name and a list of people with the name

Places

Canada
 CFB Shilo, Manitoba, Canada, a former settlement, now a military base
 Shilo, a community in the township of Centre Wellington, Ontario, Canada

Iran
 Shilan, Gilan, a village also known as Shilo

Israel
 Shilo, Mateh Binyamin, a settlement

United States
 Shiloh, DeKalb County, Alabama, a town
 Shiloh, Marengo County, Alabama, an unincorporated community
 Shiloh, Arkansas (disambiguation)
 Shiloh, Florida, a former village
 Shiloh, Georgia, a city
 Shiloh, Illinois, a village
 Shiloh, Indiana, an unincorporated town
 Shiloh, Kentucky, an unincorporated community
 Shiloh, Michigan, an unincorporated community
 Shiloh, Mississippi, a ghost town
 Shiloh, New Jersey, a borough
 Shiloh, Montgomery County, Ohio, a census-designated place
 Shiloh, Richland County, Ohio, a village
 Shiloh, York County, Pennsylvania, a census-designated place
 Shiloh, Sumter County, South Carolina, a census-designated place
 Shiloh, Tennessee (disambiguation)
 Shiloh, Texas (disambiguation)
 Shiloh, Virginia (disambiguation)
 Shiloh, West Virginia (disambiguation)
 Shiloh Creek, a stream in Kansas and Missouri
 Shiloh Historic District, Springdale, Arkansas
 Shiloh Township (disambiguation)

Religious institutions
 Shiloh Church (disambiguation)
 Shiloh Temple, a Christian facility in Maine on the National Register of Historic Places
 Shiloh Youth Revival Centers, a movement of hippy-style rescue missions founded in 1968 and dissolved in 1989
 Shiloh, a farm and retreat site in Iowa associated with The Living Word Fellowship Christian cult

Schools
 Shiloh College, Shiloh Hill, Illinois, a former teachers' college and later public school, on the National Register of Historic Places
 Shiloh High School (disambiguation)
 Shiloh Middle School, Parma, Ohio
 Shiloh School, a historic one-room school building near Kilmarnock, Virginia, on the National Register of Historic Places
 Shiloh Christian School, Springdale, Arkansas, a private school

Other uses
 Shiloh House (disambiguation), several buildings on the National Register of Historic Places
 Shiloh Museum of Ozark History, Springdale, Arkansas
 Shiloh Orphanage, a former orphanage for black children in Augusta, Georgia, on the National Register of Historic Places
 Shiloh Wind Power Plant, Montezuma Hills, California

See also
 
 
 Silo (disambiguation)